Chalk Hill may refer to:

Chalk hill, a hill made up of chalk
Chalk Hill AVA, an American viticultural area in Sonoma County, California, US
Chalk Hills, a mountain range in Los Angeles, California, US
Chalk Hill (Missouri), a peak located in Missouri, US
Chalk Hill Middle School, a middle school in Monroe, Connecticut, US
The Chalk Hills Academy, a secondary school in Luton, Bedfordshire, England
Chalkhill Estate in London, England

See also 
 Chalkhill (disambiguation)